Jacqueline Beer (born Jacqueline Vangramberg; 14 October 1932) is a French actress who was Miss France in the 1954 Miss Universe Pageant. She is Chair of the Board of Directors of the Thor Heyerdahl Institute, located in Larvik, Norway. Her second husband was scientist Thor Heyerdahl. She was sometimes credited as Jacqueline Baer.

Early years
Beer's father was "a well-known writer and owner of a large horse farm." Her formal education came at a convent near Paris.

Film and TV
Soon after winning the Miss France contest, Beer signed a contract with Paramount Pictures. Her American film debut came in 1956 when she had an uncredited role as a model in Bob Hope comedy That Certain Feeling. She also played Marianne in war drama Screaming Eagles (1956) and Monique Souvir in the mystery/thriller The Prize (1963). She guest starred in the first season of Maverick in a 1958 episode titled "Diamond in the Rough" starring Jack Kelly loosely based on the true story of the Great Diamond Hoax of 1872.

She is best remembered today for her five-year role as Suzanne Fabray, nicknamed "Frenchy," the charming and efficient switchboard operator (and occasional operative) on the classic private eye TV series 77 Sunset Strip starring Efrem Zimbalist Jr..

Personal life
Beer married Jean Antoine Garcia Roady, an accountant, on November 26, 1955. They had two sons, Serge and Laurent, and a daughter, Sabine.

In 1991, Beer married ethnographer and adventurer Thor Heyerdahl, whom she met in Güímar, on the Spanish island of Tenerife. She became part of his work, using her skills as an amateur photographer. Since his death in 2002, she has remained active in the Thor Heyerdahl Research Centre in Aylesbury, UK, and is Chair of the Board of Directors.

Television appearances

References

External links

1932 births
Living people
Actresses from Paris
French emigrants to the United States
French film actresses
French television actresses
Miss France winners
Miss Universe 1954 contestants
20th-century French actresses
21st-century French women